Cap Tafelneh was a  cargo ship which was built in 1920 by Burntisland Shipbuilding Company Ltd, Fife, Scotland. She was built for Joseph Lasry as Sydney Lasry. In 1931, she was sold to Compagnie Générale Transatlantique and renamed Ariège. In 1938 she was sold to Société Anonyme de Gerance D'Armement and renamed Cap Tafelneh. She was bombed and sunk at Dunkirk in 1940.

Salvaged by Germany, she was renamed Carl Arp. She was seized as a war prize at Hamburg in May 1945 and passed to the Ministry of War Transport (MoWT) and renamed Empire Chelmer. She was returned to Société Anonyme de Gerance D'Armement in 1946 and regained her former name Cap Tafelneh. In 1950, she was sold to Mustafa Nuri Andak, Turkey and renamed Kandilli. In 1957, she was sold to Nejat Doğan & Co and renamed Kahraman Doğan. She served until 1975, when she was sold for scrapping.

Description
The ship was built by Burntisland Shipbuilding Co Ltd, Burntisland,
 as yard number 105. She was launched on 3 March 1920, and completed in September 1920.

She had a GRT of 2,266 and a NRT of 1,410. Her DWT was 3,870.

The ship was propelled by a triple expansion steam engine which had cylinders of 22 inches (57 cm),  and  diameter by  stroke. The engine was built by Cooper & Greig Ltd, Dundee.

History
Sydney Lasry built for the Compagnie Lasry, Oran, French Algeria. She was registered on 23 May 1920. She was completed in September 1920. Her port of registry was Oran, under the French flag and the Code Letters OUAG were allocated. Sydney Lasry was renamed Ariège in 1933. She was sold to the Compagnie Générale Transatlantique in December 1934. Her code letters were changed to FNUA in 1934. On 5 December 1934, Ariège was the first ship to enter port at Safi, Morocco. In March 1938, Ariège was sold to Société Anonyme de Gérance et d'Armement and renamed Cap Tafelneh. Her port of registry was changed to Dunkirk. In 1938, Cap Tafelneh's GRT was recorded as 2,299 and her NRT as 1,399.

Cap Tafelneh was to have been a member of Convoy FS 5, but the convoy was cancelled on 15 May 1940. On 27 May 1940, Cap Tafelneh was sunk in a Luftwaffe air raid on Dunkirk. She was refloated on 13 May 1941. Salvaged by Germany, after repairs she was placed under the management of Heinrich F C Arp, Hamburg. She was renamed Carl Arp. In May 1945, Carl Arp was seized as a war prize at Hamburg. Ownership was passed to the MoWT and she was renamed Empire Chelmer.

In 1946, she was returned to Société Anonyme de Gerance et d'Armement and regained her former name Cap Tafelneh. In 1950, she was sold to Mustafa Andi Nurak, Istanbul, Turkey and renamed Kandilli. In 1957, she was sold to Nejat Doğan & Co, Istanbul and renamed Kahraman Doğan. She served until 1972. Kahraman Doğan was sold for scrap, arriving at Haliç on 24 April for demolition.

References

External links
Photo of Cap Tafelneh
Photo of sunken Cap Tafelneh

1920 ships
Ships built in Scotland
Merchant ships of France
Steamships of France
World War II merchant ships of France
Maritime incidents in May 1940
Shipwrecks in the English Channel
World War II merchant ships of Germany
Steamships of Germany
Empire ships
Ministry of War Transport ships
Steamships of the United Kingdom
Merchant ships of the United Kingdom
Steamships of Turkey
Cargo ships of Turkey
Ships sunk by German aircraft
Ships of the Compagnie Générale Transatlantique